Connected devices may refer to:

 Smart device,  an autonomous electronic device that may be connect to others in a network
 Mobile device, a computing device typically small enough to be handheld
 Mobile Internet device, a multimedia-capable mobile device providing wireless Internet access
 Wearable computer, also known as body-borne computer or wearable, a smart device worn like clothing or jewelry